Thomas Napier may refer to:
 Thomas Napier (builder) (1802–1881), Scottish builder who moved to Australia
 Sir Thomas John Mellis Napier (1882–1976), Justice and Chief Justice of the Supreme Court of South Australia
 Thomas Bateman Napier (1854–1933), British Member of Parliament for Faversham
 Thomas Napier (British Army officer) (1790–1863), British general